Aemene is a genus of moths in the family Erebidae first described by Francis Walker in 1854. They are found in Japan, throughout India and Sri Lanka.

Description
Palpi porrect (extending forward), reaching beyond the frons. Antennae serrate in male and ciliated in female. Forewings short. Vein 3 from before angle of cell. Vein 4 and 5 from close to angle. Vein 6 from below upper angle. Veins 7 to 9 stalked. Hindwings with veins 4 and 5 from close to the angle and vein 3 absent. Vein 6 and 7 stalked and vein 8 from middle of cell.

Species
Aemene altaica (Lederer, 1855)
Aemene amnaea Swinhoe, 1894
Aemene clarimaculata Holloway, 2001
Aemene fumosa Černý, 2009
Aemene hortensis Černý, 2009
Aemene maculata (Poujade, 1886)
Aemene maculifascia Moore, 1878
Aemene marginipuncta (Talbot, 1926)
Aemene mesozonata Hampson, 1898
Aemene micromesozona Holloway, 2001
Aemene monastyrskii Dubatolov & Bucsek, 2013
Aemene pseudonigra Holloway, 2001
Aemene punctatissima Poujade, 1886
Aemene punctigera Leech, 1899
Aemene taprobanis Walker, 1854
Aemene taeniata Fixsen, 1887

References

Cisthenina
Moth genera